Troy Norman Murray (born July 31, 1962) is a Canadian former professional ice hockey centre who played in the NHL. He is currently the color analyst on NBC Sports Chicago broadcasts of Chicago Blackhawks hockey games. Murray was born in Calgary, Alberta, but grew up in St. Albert, Alberta.

Playing career

Amateur
Murray played part of two seasons (1978–1980) with the St. Albert Saints of the Alberta Junior Hockey League. He also played briefly in two games with the Lethbridge Broncos of the Western Hockey League. In two seasons at the University of North Dakota, he was twice named to the Western Collegiate Hockey Association Second All-Star Team in 1981 and 1982.  He led North Dakota in scoring as a freshman and helped them capture an NCAA Title in 1982. In 1982, Murray was chosen to play for Team Canada at the World Junior Ice Hockey Championships. He was named team captain and led the team to a gold medal victory.

Professional
Murray was drafted out of the University of North Dakota by the Chicago Black Hawks with the 57th overall selection in the 3rd round of the 1980 NHL Entry Draft. He made his National Hockey League debut in the 1981–82 season playoffs on April 4, 1982, against the Minnesota North Stars where he scored his first-ever NHL goal. The Black Hawks would be defeated in the Campbell Finals by the Vancouver Canucks. His first-ever NHL regular season goal came against the Toronto Maple Leafs and he would finish his rookie season with 16 points in 54 games. Murray's career peaked during the 1985–86 season, as he scored 99 points. He was awarded the Frank J. Selke Trophy for best defensive forward in the league that year.

In 1991-92, Murray was traded to the Winnipeg Jets along with teammate Warren Rychel for Bryan Marchment and Chris Norton. Murray was named team captain and finished with 47 points in 79 games that season. His stay in Winnipeg was short-lived as he was reacquired by the Blackhawks in 1992–93. A year later he was again traded, this time to the Ottawa Senators. He was the only player on the team to finish with a plus rating. Murray was traded in 1994-95 to the Pittsburgh Penguins. He played in 13 games with them before being traded again in 1995–96 to the Colorado Avalanche. Murray and the Avalanche made it all the way to the Stanley Cup Finals where they defeated the Florida Panthers in four games. Murray won his first and only Stanley Cup with the Avalanche. Murray remained in hockey for one more year with the Chicago Wolves of the International Hockey League before retiring in 1997.

Murray finished his career scoring 230 goals and 354 assists in 915 career NHL games. Murray played in twelve seasons with the Blackhawks, and ranks 18th on the Blackhawks all-time assists list with 291, 19th on the all-time points list with 488, and 21st all-time in goals with 197.

Broadcasting career
After retirement Murray joined the Blackhawks TV crew as the studio analyst, a position he held from the start of the 1998–99 season until November 13, 2003. Troy was then named TV color commentator teaming up with Pat Foley for two seasons in which their play by play was simulcast on the then radio flagship WSCR.

Before the start of the 2006–07 season Foley was let go and the radio and television broadcasts were separated. At this time Murray was paired with former New York Islanders voice John Wiedeman. Since pairing with Wiedeman, the duo has gone on to call three Stanley Cup Championships.

In June 2015, Murray and broadcast partners John Wiedeman and Judd Sirott received top honors in the Chicago Market "Best Radio Play-By-Play" category at the Illinois Broadcasters Association Silver Dome Awards. They had previously won the award in 2011 and 2014. He and Wiedeman also received top honors in the "Best Sports Story" category at the 2012 IBA Silver Dome Awards.

Murray announced he was diagnosed with cancer on August 9, 2021, but will continue to broadcast as able.

In August 2022, the Blackhawks announced Murray and Patrick Sharp together will succeed Eddie Olczyk as the team's TV color commentator.

Career statistics

Regular season and playoffs

International

Awards and honours

References

External links
 

1962 births
Canadian ice hockey centres
Chicago Blackhawks announcers
Chicago Blackhawks draft picks
Chicago Blackhawks players
Colorado Avalanche players
Frank Selke Trophy winners
Lethbridge Broncos players
Living people
National Hockey League broadcasters
Ottawa Senators players
Pittsburgh Penguins players
St. Albert Saints players
Ice hockey people from Calgary
Sportspeople from St. Albert, Alberta
Stanley Cup champions
North Dakota Fighting Hawks men's ice hockey players
Winnipeg Jets (1972–1996) captains
Winnipeg Jets (1979–1996) players
NCAA men's ice hockey national champions